Winston Heights/Mountview is a residential neighbourhood in the northeast quadrant of Calgary, Alberta. It is bounded by 32 Avenue to the north, the Nose Creek and Deerfoot Trail to the east, Trans-Canada Highway to the south and Edmonton Trail to the west. Fox Hollow Golf Course and The Winston Golf Club are developed at the eastern edge of the neighbourhood.

It is represented in the Calgary City Council by the Ward 4 councillor.

The neighbourhood was established in 1932 and largely expanded in the 1950s. The community has an area redevelopment plan in place.

Demographics

Residents in this community had a median household income of $41,065 in 2000, and there were 24.5% low income residents living in the neighbourhood. As of 2000, 18.7% of the residents were immigrants. A proportion of 21.1% of the buildings were condominiums or apartments, and 36.8% of the housing was used for renting.

Education
The community is served by Georges P. Vanier Bilingual Junior High and Mount View Elementary public schools.

See also
List of neighbourhoods in Calgary

References

External links
Winston Heights - MountainviewCommunity Association

Neighbourhoods in Calgary
1932 establishments in Alberta